"Lucretia My Reflection" is a song by English rock band the Sisters of Mercy. Released as the third and final single from their second studio album, Floodland, in June 1988, it peaked at number 20 on the UK Singles Chart.

Overview
The song was written by Andrew Eldritch for Patricia Morrison, who, he said, "always strikes me as a Lucrezia [Borgia]-type person."  Its lyrics concern the fall of an empire, war and the consequent destruction of other aspects of life. Aside from the reference to Lucrezia Borgia, Lucretia was a Noble Roman woman, whose rape by Etruscan King Sextus Tarquinius, and subsequent suicide, triggered the collapse of the early Roman monarchy, leading to the Roman republic. The story of Lucretia was primarily used in Rome as a didactic tale, similar to the story of Lucius Quinctius Cincinnatus, to showcase what the archetypal Roman woman should aspire to be.

Track listing
All songs written by Andrew Eldritch.

Charts

References

The Sisters of Mercy songs
1987 songs
1988 singles
Songs written by Andrew Eldritch